Tommy Cheung Yu-yan, GBS, JP (born 30 September 1949 in Hong Kong) is a member of the Legislative Council of Hong Kong (LegCo), representing the Catering functional constituencies seats. He is a non-official member of the Executive Council of Hong Kong and the current chairman of the Liberal Party.

Career
He graduated from the Diocesan Boys' School and Pepperdine University. He was previously a member of the Eastern District Council. He is a businessman, chairman of a trading and investment company, and a member of the Diocesan Boys' School school committee.

Legislative Councillor
In late 2005, when there were strong concerns regarding a potential "bird flu" pandemic, Cheung became "an outspoken opponent of migratory birds". He stated that migrating birds were the source of the pandemic threat.

On 20 March 2010, after Cheung suggested a minimum wage of HK$20/hour, he became the subject of insults and derision from some quarters, nicknamed "$20 Cheung".

During the 2020 coronavirus pandemic, Cheung spoke out against the government's extension of mandatory social distancing measures. He complained that his constituents were suffering due to mandatory closures of some types of businesses, such as bars and karaoke centres, and accused the government of "not understanding economics".

In January 2021, Cheung partially blamed teachers for the 2019-20 Hong Kong protests and that CCTV cameras should be installed in classrooms to monitor teachers for "subversive remarks."

In December 2022, Cheung was part of 3 lawmakers who drafted legislation to reform CUHK's governing council, saying "During the anti-government turmoil in 2019, there was a riot on the campus of CUHK but the attitude and handling of the incident by CUHK were appalling.

In December 2022, Cheung said "We need to take action to correct such behaviour that is this disrespectful to Hong Kong and to our country" and that he would support summing Google to the Legislative Council, to answer questions on why Glory to Hong Kong was ranked so highly when searching for the national anthem of Hong Kong. At the same month, he was tested positive for COVID-19.

Chairman of the Liberal Party
Cheung was elected Liberal Party's new chairman after the 2016 Legislative Council election in October. The new leadership was seen as more moderate and conservative with less vocal anti-Leung Chun-ying (pro-government, but anti-Leung) stance. Cheung was subsequently appointed by Leung to the Executive Council. Cheung is reappointed by Carrie Lam to the Executive Council on 1 July 2017.

Cheung voted against paternity leave when it was introduced to the Employment Ordinance in 2015. In 2018, he opposed the Hong Kong government proposal to increase statutory paternity leave from three days to five, claiming the benefit itself should not even exist, as demands for more would be "never-ending". Cheung said that "back in the 1980s" there was no legally mandated paternal leave, but many companies would still grant "white days" for funerals and "red days" for auspicious events such as births and marriages without the need for "inflexible" labour laws requiring them to do so. Cheung's remarks attracted a lot of criticism, including Ng Chau-pei of the pro-Beijing Hong Kong Federation of Trade Unions described Cheung as taking part in a "barbaric form of capitalism". Another Executive Councillor, New People's Party chairwoman Regina Ip agreed members should avoid publicly criticising the government.

References

External links
Official site of Tommy Cheung

1949 births
District councillors of Eastern District
Living people
Hong Kong Christians
Hong Kong businesspeople
Pepperdine University alumni
Liberal Party (Hong Kong) politicians
HK LegCo Members 2000–2004
HK LegCo Members 2004–2008
HK LegCo Members 2008–2012
HK LegCo Members 2012–2016
HK LegCo Members 2016–2021
HK LegCo Members 2022–2025
Hong Kong pro-Beijing politicians
Hong Kong Basic Law Consultative Committee members
Members of the Executive Council of Hong Kong
Recipients of the Gold Bauhinia Star
Recipients of the Silver Bauhinia Star